The 2006 Gaz de France Stars was a tennis tournament played on indoor hard courts. It was the 3rd edition of the Gaz de France Stars, and was part of the WTA International tournaments of the 2006 WTA Tour. It took place in Hasselt, Belgium, in late October and early November, 2006.

Champions

Singles

 Kim Clijsters def.  Kaia Kanepi, 6–3, 3–6, 6–4

Doubles

 Lisa Raymond /  Samantha Stosur def.  Eleni Daniilidou /  Jasmin Wöhr, 6–2, 6–3

References

Gaz de France Stars
Gaz
Gaz de France Stars
Sport in Hasselt